Amarjit Kaypee (born 2 October 1960 in Jalandhar, Punjab) is an Indian former cricketer. He was primarily a right-handed batsman, and he held the record for the most runs scored in the Ranji Trophy, India's premier domestic first-class cricket competition for a number of years before Amol Muzumdar took the record in 2009. However, despite his success, he was never selected for the Indian national team, an unfortunate feat he shares with the man who broke his record.

Kaypee began his first-class career with Punjab in the 1980-81 season making his debut against Jammu and Kashmir. Having played a few reasonably good seasons for Punjab, he moved to Haryana in 1986-87. It was here where Kaypee played for the rest of his career and where he found much success.

Kaypee's most successful season was in 1990-91 when he scored 940 runs in the Ranji Trophy, helping Haryana to their first and, to date, only Ranji Trophy title. He was the top run-scorer in the competition that year, and he was named as an Indian Cricket Cricketer of the Year. The following season, he had another prolific Ranji Trophy, scoring 812 runs.

He continued to perform consistently well for Haryana for many seasons, and even captained the team in 31 matches. However, he was only twice selected in the North Zone team for the Duleep Trophy, playing two matches each in the 1991-92 and 1992-93 seasons. As a result, he tended to be overlooked by the national team selectors, and so never made an appearance for the national side.

In October 2000, Kaypee retired from cricket. He finished his career with a record aggregate of 7623 runs in the Ranji Trophy including 27 centuries. Post retirement kaypee was appointed as the head coach of the Haryana team for the 2008-09 season. Kaypee was also a match referee for the BCCI for a number of seasons.

In April 2006 Kaypee was part of the Indian veterans team that visited Pakistan to play a limited-overs 4 match series against a Pakistan Veteran's XI, organised by the Pakistan Seniors Cricket Board. The Indian side was led by former Indian captain Mohammad Azharuddin.

In the 1990s Kaypee had a spell with Smethwick and streetly Cricket Club, as their overseas player.

References

External links
 
 Player Profile: Amarjit Kaypee from CricketArchive

1960 births
Living people
Indian cricketers
Haryana cricketers
Punjab, India cricketers
North Zone cricketers
Cricketers from Jalandhar